Man Cheung Po is an area of Lantau Island in Hong Kong.

History
In 1955, Austin Coates described Man Cheung Po as a small settlement with a population of about 20, "high up in the hills, 40 minutes hard walking from Leung Uk", there principal dwelling being is a Buddhist nunnery partly rebuilt in 1953.

Features
Man Cheung Po, together with Ngong Ping, Keung Shan, Luk Wu and Tei Tong Tsai are considered as the five major Buddhist sites of Lantau Island, hosting numerous temples and gardens.

Tsz Hing Monastery is located at Man Cheung Po.

Access
Man Cheung Po is located at the end of stage 5 and at the start of stage 6 of the Lantau Trail.

References

External links
 Agriculture, Fisheries and Conservation Department. Man Cheung Po Campsite
 Antiquities Advisory Board. Historic Building Appraisal. Tsz Hing Monastery, Residence of Female Practitioners Pictures
 Antiquities Advisory Board. Historic Building Appraisal. Tsz Hing Monastery, Tai Hung Po Din Pictures
 Antiquities Advisory Board. Historic Building Appraisal. Tsz Hing Monastery, Service Quarters Pictures
 Antiquities Advisory Board. Historic Building Appraisal. Tsz Hing Monastery, Residence of Male Practitioners Pictures
 Antiquities Advisory Board. Historic Building Appraisal. Tsz Hing Monastery, Service Quarters Pictures

Lantau Island